Dustin Sherer is a former indoor American football defensive lineman. He is also a fitness instructor.

In 2003, Sherer suffered a catastrophic injury and despite odds against him ever playing football again, he played at the College of the Canyons in Los Angeles, Blinn College, and then eventually at Bacone College in Oklahoma. There, he earned the Central States Football League honorable mention. In 2012, his NAIA stats show he ranked #3 in Division 1 for fumbles forced per game and #27 for sacks per game.

References

External links
NAIA Official Stats (2012) Bacone 
EuroPlayers Profile (2012)

Year of birth missing (living people)
Living people
American football defensive linemen
People from El Paso, Texas
College of the Canyons Cougars football players
Blinn Buccaneers football players
Bacone Warriors football players
Bacone College alumni
Sioux City Bandits players
Texas Revolution players
1980s births